Joachim Bartholomae (born 1956) is a German author and sociologist.

Life
After school Bartholomae studied sociology in Bielefeld. Bartholomae worked after university for book publisher Männerschwarm Verlag in Hamburg.

Works
 Die Engel sind echt. anthology 1994. 169 pages. .
 Hildegard! Storno!. 1999. 207 pages. .
 Lauter schöne Lügen. 11 love stories. 200 pages. .
 American Love-Story. 208 pages. .
 Hamburg mit anderen Augen. City guide for Gays. 256 pages. .
 Prinzen unterwegs. reader book. 256 pages. .

External links
 Männerschwarm:Joachim Bartholomae

German non-fiction writers
German sociologists
German gay writers
1956 births
Living people
German LGBT scientists
German male non-fiction writers